Eduard Momotov (born 22 January 1970) is an Uzbek professional football coach and a former player. He also holds Russian citizenship. He is the manager of FC Novokuznetsk.

Personal life
Momotov is the son of former hockey player Evgeni Momotov.

References

External links

1970 births
Sportspeople from Oskemen
Living people
Soviet footballers
Uzbekistani footballers
Uzbekistan international footballers
1996 AFC Asian Cup players
Uzbekistani expatriate footballers
Expatriate footballers in Russia
Uzbekistani expatriate sportspeople in Russia
Russian Premier League players
Navbahor Namangan players
FC Chernomorets Novorossiysk players
FC Taraz players
FC Vostok players
FK Neftchi Farg'ona players
Uzbekistani football managers
Uzbekistani people of Russian descent
Uzbekistani expatriate football managers
Expatriate football managers in Russia
Association football defenders
FC Novokuznetsk players
Footballers at the 1998 Asian Games
Asian Games competitors for Uzbekistan
FC Kuzbass Kemerovo managers